The name Eriboea may refer to:

Eriboea (mythology) 
In biology, two species of butterflies:
Eriboea dolon, synonym for Polyura dolon
Eriboea aile, synonym for Baeotus aeilus